Roy Thomas Edmond Bergiers (born 11 November 1950) is a Welsh former rugby union player. Born in Carmarthen, he played his club rugby for Llanelli RFC. In October 1972, he scored the only try in Llanelli's famous 9–3 victory over the New Zealand national team in one of the biggest upsets in the history of rugby.

Bergiers played 11 tests for Wales and scored two tries. He made his debut against England at Twickenham on 15 January 1972. In 1974, he toured South Africa with the British Lions. His last test came against Ireland in Cardiff on 15 March 1975.

References

1950 births
Living people
Rugby union players from Carmarthen
Wales international rugby union players
Welsh rugby union players
British & Irish Lions rugby union players from Wales
Llanelli RFC players
Rugby union centres